Margaret Clive, Baroness Clive (née Maskelyne; 26 October 1735 – 28 December 1817) was a British society figure. She went out to India to meet an admirer and married a military hero. She was in Bengal as their family became incredibly wealthy. When they returned to England the aristocracy did not welcome "new money".

Life
Clive was born in Kensington Gore in London in 1735, her elder brother was the Astronomer Royal Nevil Maskelyne and she was the last of four children born to Elizabeth (born Booth) and Edmund Maskelyne. She lived at home until she was about thirteen when her mother died and she was sent to stay with relatives in Wiltshire where she started school when she was about fourteen. Mrs Saintsbury of Cirencester taught her and she was gifted at French.

She went out to India at the suggestion of her brother Edmund with the intention of chasing Robert Clive, who was a colleague. When she set out he was a man who reportedly had fallen in love with her portrait; when she arrived Robert Clive was a hero. Her voyage was not in vain as she married him at St. Mary's Church in (then) Madras on 18 February 1753. They returned to England, but they returned in 1755 for five years as the British East India Company consolidated its position in Bengal. 

Her husband died in 1774. She had to find a home. In 1781 the owner of Englefield House and estate in Berkshire was short of money and decided to rent the house. The rent was set for 400 guineas p.a. but it was let to her for 300 as the owner was keen to find the right tenant who would not interfere with the house's character too much. The house was rented complete with a deer park, three manors and with a library of thousands of pounds' worth of books.

Clive died in Oakly Park, Bromfield, Shropshire, in 1817.

Family
She and Robert Clive had nine children:
 Edward Clive, 1st Earl of Powis (b. 7 March 1754, d. 16 May 1839)
 Rebecca Clive (b. 15 September 1760, bapt 10 October 1760 Moreton Say, d. December 1795, married in 1780 to Lt-Gen John Robinson of Denston Hall Suffolk, MP (d. 1798.)
 Charlotte Clive (b. 19 January 1762, d. unm 20 October 1795)
 Margaret Clive (bapt 18 September 1763 Condover, Shropshire, d. June 1814, married 11 April 1780 Lt-Col Lambert Theodore Walpole (d. in Wexford Rebellion 1798)
 Elizabeth Clive (bapt 18 November 1764 Condover, d. young)
 Richard Clive (d. young)
 Robert Clive (d. young)
 Robert Clive Jnr (b. 14 August 1769, d. unm 28 July 1833), Lt-Col.
 Jane Clive (d. young)

References

1735 births
1817 deaths
People from Kensington
British socialites
British baronesses
Wives of knights